Marigot is the main town and capital in the French Collectivity of Saint Martin.

History and features
Originally a fishing village on a swamp for which it was named, Marigot was made capital during the reign of King Louis XVI of France, who built Fort St. Louis on a hill near Marigot Bay. Today, that building is the most important in Marigot.

Marigot is typical of Caribbean towns, with gingerbread houses and sidewalk bistros. Market days are every Wednesday and Saturday morning.
The crew of the 1997 motion picture Speed 2 shot the final scene here where the Seabourn Legend hits the island.

The St. Martin of Tours' Church on rue du Fort Louis was built in 1941.

Geography

Marigot is located on the west coast of the island of St. Martin. It extends from the coast to the west, along the Bay of Marigot and the hills of the interior of the island to the east. On the south-west it is bounded by the Simpson Bay.

Climate
Marigot has a tropical savanna climate (Köppen Aw), with very warm to hot and humid weather throughout the year. Rainfall – which is reduced by the rain shadow of the mountains to the east – is not as extreme as in most climates of this type, with the peak occurring from August to November due to hurricanes.

Transport

The city is served by Princess Juliana International Airport as well as L'Espérance Airport. There is a ferry to Blowing Point, Anguilla.

See also
List of lighthouses in the Collectivity of Saint Martin
San Martin shopping

References

External links 
 
 Saint Martin Tourist Guide
 www.geographia.com, St Martin

 
Populated places in the Collectivity of Saint Martin
Capitals in the Caribbean
Lighthouses in the Collectivity of Saint Martin